Constitutional Assembly elections were held in Bulgaria in June 1881. The body known as the Grand National Assembly (Bulgaria: Велико Народно събрание - Veliko Narodno Subranie) was convened for a second time in Svishtov in order to consider the amendments to the constitution proposed by prince Alexander I of Battenberg. The proposed amendments were an echo from the Conservative's requests during the first constitutional assembly elections back in 1879. The amendments proposed included restricting civil liberties, reducing the size of the National Assembly, making the franchise indirect and introducing a state council. These amendments would, in effect, suspend the constitution and turn Bulgaria into an authoritarian dictatorship.

Campaign
At first the Liberal Party was not perturbed by the proposed amendments as they believed the Bulgarian people were opposed to them and stood behind the Liberal Party. Believing this would be reflected in the election results, the Liberal Party was confident it would dominate the new assembly. This confidence evaporated when Russia decided to back the prince during the election. Russian soldiers were available at the polls to "help illiterates" and to "preserve order", though they placed little restraint on pro-Battenburgist thugs who congregated around polling stations.

Results
Having "practiced all the latest modes of bulldozing known to the enlightened citizens", the pro-Battenberg conservatives were able to secure the majority they wanted. Only two electoral districts returned liberal deputies and not all of them reached the assembly.

Aftermath
On July 1 the GNA convened in Svishtov. The overwhelming conservative majority supported the constitutional amendments, taking less than two hours to pass all of them. The Prince Alexander had in effect carried out a coup d'état. Following the coup, many infuriated liberals left Bulgaria. Battenberg's regime was weak from the get-go, however, as the real power was being absorbed by the two Russian generals dispatched from Saint-Petersburg, Leonid Sobolev and Alexander Kaulbars. The regime eventually collapsed and the constitution was restored on 6 September 1883.

References

Bulgaria
1881 in Bulgaria
Elections in Bulgaria
June 1881 events